The Misamis Occidental Science and Technology High School (Mataas na Paaralang Pang-Agham at Pangteknolohiya ng Misamis Occidental) is a Secondary Public Science High School system located at barangay Pines, Oroquieta City, Misamis Occidental, Philippines.  It is a DepEd-recognized science high school.

Science high schools in the Philippines
Schools in Misamis Occidental